Rafael Arcadio Bernal Supelano C.Ss.R. (28 November 1934 – 11 January 2019) was a Colombian Roman Catholic bishop.

Early life 
Bernal Supelano was born in Colombia and was ordained to the priesthood in 1959. He served as titular bishop of Amundrasa and as bishop of the Vicariate Apostolic of Sibundoy, Colombia, from 1978 to 1990. He then served as bishop of the Roman Catholic Diocese of Arauca, Colombia, from 1990 to 2003 and as bishop of the Roman Catholic Diocese of Libano–Honda, Colombia, from 2003 to 2004.

Notes

1934 births
2019 deaths
People from Zipaquirá
20th-century Roman Catholic bishops in Colombia
Redemptorist bishops
21st-century Roman Catholic bishops in Colombia
Roman Catholic bishops of Mocoa–Sibundoy
Roman Catholic bishops of Líbano–Honda
Roman Catholic bishops of Arauca